"Voices" is a song by British YouTuber and rapper KSI featuring American singer Oliver Tree. The song was written by the two artists alongside Conor Blake Manning, Sara Boe and producers Digital Farm Animals and Mojam. "Voices" was released for digital download and streaming by Warner Music Group, Beerus Limited, and Atlantic Records on 27 January 2023.

"Voices" debuted at number 11 on the UK Singles Chart, becoming KSI's eighteenth top 40 hit.

Music and lyrics 
Speaking about "Voices", KSI said, "'Voices’ is a song I worked on during my weird phase mentally. This is a big song for me because it marked a big chapter in my life. After my breakup, I thought I was fine, but I had these voices in my head telling me I wasn’t as happy as I thought I was.."

Oliver Tree said. "The song is about the pain we experience in the aftermath of a breakup. Lying to ourselves as we try to replace the void with a fling or waking up in your cold empty bed alone. That person can haunt our head for months, even years after. Wondering if we will ever escape the memories of the person, we once loved who’s now a stranger."

Music video 
The music video was directed by Oliver Tree and was released to KSI's YouTube channel on 27 January 2023.

Credits and personnel 
 Digital Farm Animals – producer, composer, programmer
 Mojam – producer, composer, programmer
 KSI – vocals, composer
 Oliver Tree – vocals
 Conor Blake Manning – composer
 Sara Boe – composer, whistle
 Stuart Hawkes – mastering
 Trey Station – mixing
 Anthony Vilchils – mixing
 Zach Pereyra – mixing
 Manny Marroquin – mixing
 Marc Fineman – bass, drums, guitar, keyboards, percussion, synthesizer
 Will Vaughan – guitar

Charts

Release history

References 

2023 songs
2023 singles
KSI songs
Oliver Tree songs